γ-Amino-β-hydroxybutyric acid (GABOB), also known as β-hydroxy-γ-aminobutyric acid (β-hydroxy-GABA), and sold under the brand name Gamibetal among others, is an anticonvulsant which is used for the treatment of epilepsy in Europe, Japan, and Mexico. It is a GABA analogue, or an analogue of the neurotransmitter γ-aminobutyric acid (GABA), and has been found to be an endogenous metabolite of GABA.

Medical uses
GABOB is an anticonvulsant and is used in the treatment of epilepsy.

Pharmacology
GABOB is a GABA receptor agonist. It has two stereoisomers, and shows stereoselectivity in its actions. Specifically, (R)-(–)-GABOB is a moderate-potency agonist of the GABAB receptor, while (S)-(+)-GABOB is a partial agonist of the GABAB receptor and an agonist of the GABAA receptor. (S)-(+)-GABOB is around twice as potent an anticonvulsant as (R)-(–)-GABOB. GABOB is used medically as a racemic mixture.

Relative to GABA, GABOB has more potent inhibitory effects on the central nervous system, perhaps due to its greater capacity to cross the blood–brain barrier. However, GABOB is of relatively low potency as an anticonvulsant when used by itself, and is more useful as an adjuvant treatment used alongside another anticonvulsant.

Chemistry
GABOB, or β-hydroxy-GABA, is a close structural analogue of GABA (see GABA analogue), as well as of γ-hydroxybutyric acid (GHB), phenibut (β-phenyl-GABA), baclofen (β-(4-chlorophenyl)-GABA), and pregabalin (β-isobutyl-GABA).

Society and culture

Generic name
GABOB has been referred to by the generic name buxamine or buxamina.

Brand names
GABOB is sold primarily under the brand name Gamibetal. It has also been marketed under a variety of other brand names including Aminoxan, Bogil, Diastal, Gabimex, Gabomade, Gaboril, Gamalate, and Kolpo.

References

Amino acids
Anticonvulsants
Beta hydroxy acids
GABA analogues
GABAA receptor agonists
GABAB receptor agonists
Human metabolites
Neurotransmitters